Comisión de Actividades Infantiles (English: Committee on Children's Activities), also known simply as CAI, is an Argentine football club located in the city of Comodoro Rivadavia, of Chubut Province. The team plays in Torneo Argentino A.

The club was founded on 1 January 1984, as a sports club for young people, though by 1989 the activity focused only on football. The team currently plays in the Primera B division of the Argentine league (which is equivalent to the second division). Home games are played at the Estadio Municipal de Comodoro Rivadavia, which has a capacity of approximately 10,000 seats. The club focuses primarily on the development of players from its youth divisions.

Current squad
As of November 2017.

National honours
Torneo Argentino A: 1
2001/02

Former players

See also
List of football clubs in Argentina
Argentine football league system

References

External links

Official Site

 
Commission de Actividades Infantiles
Association football clubs established in 1984
1984 establishments in Argentina